Mario Sánchez Yantén (born 22 July 1956) is a retired Chilean football referee. 

He refereed two matches in the 1998 FIFA World Cup in France: Nigeria's 1–0 win over Bulgaria, and South Africa's 2–2 draw with Saudi Arabia. He also officiated the 2000 Summer Olympics in Sydney and the 1998 Intercontinental Cup final.

References
Profile

1956 births
Living people
Chilean football referees
FIFA World Cup referees
1998 FIFA World Cup referees
CONCACAF Gold Cup referees
Olympic football referees